Eric Christensen (born March 12, 1969) is an American Visual Effects Supervisor and Chief Executive Officer of two Visual Effects Companies.

Christensen was born in Redding, California. Christensen quit ILM to form his own company, "RotoFactory" in 2006 to offer other visual effects shops in the United States an opportunity to keep their 2D outsourcing domestic. In 2010, Christensen expanded into New Orleans, Louisiana, to offer expanded services to the major motion picture studios as well as a 30% tax incentive allowed by the state of Louisiana. Christensen's Factory VFX also began training programs to assist New Orleans residents in developing a new industry, working with both government programs and local city non-profits, Factory VFX is helping revitalize a city affected by natural and man-made disasters.

Aside from his Visual Effects film-work, Christensen also runs three additional companies all under the banner of Christensen Media Services that includes television production, digital and print publications.

References

External links

1969 births
Living people
Artists from California
Businesspeople from California
People from Redding, California